Hộ Phòng  is a ward (phường) of Giá Rai town, Bạc Liêu Province in the Mekong Delta region of Vietnam.

References

Populated places in Bạc Liêu province
Communes of Bạc Liêu province